Jacob Michael Hennessy (born 10 August 1996 in St Neots) is a British cyclist, who currently rides for UCI Continental team . Hennessy specialises in classic style races and sprint finishes.

Major results

2016
 1st Skipton, National Circuit Series
 1st Jock Wadley Memorial Road Race
2017
 1st Ghent–Wevelgem U23
 1st GP Mémorial Pierre Dewailly
 5th Overall Paris–Arras Tour
1st Stage 1
2019
 1st Round 2 – Motherwell, Tour Series
 2nd Omloop van het Waasland
 7th Arno Wallaard Memorial

References

External links

1996 births
Living people
British male cyclists
English male cyclists
People from St Neots